The Battle of Helgeå (Norwegian: Slaget ved Helgeå, Swedish: Slaget vid Helgeå), or Battle of the Holy River, was a naval engagement which took place in 1026 between joint Danish and English forces and a combined Norwegian and Swedish force, at the estuary of a river called Helge (Holy River) in Sweden or Denmark. There are two rivers that go by that name, and they are now both in Sweden but back then the southern province of Skåne/Scania was Danish.

King Olaf II of Norway and King Anund Jacob of Sweden took advantage of the commitment of Danish King Cnut in England and began to launch attacks on the Danish in the Baltic Sea. The Swedish and Norwegian navies led by kings Anund Jacob and Olaf II lay in wait up the river for the navy of King Cnut, which was commanded by Danish earl Ulf Jarl.

Cnut's navy was massive; his own ship is said to have been 80 metres long. The Swedish and the Norwegian kings ordered a large dam be made of peat and lumber on the river. When the Danish navy sailed in, the water was released and a great many Danes and Englishmen drowned in the deluge. However, the main strength of Cnut's fleet lay outside the river harbour. After the ships in the harbour were destroyed, the rest of the fleet gathered together from all quarters. The kings Olaf and Anund Jacob, seeing they had got all the victory that fate permitted them to gain for the moment, let their ships retreat. If the battle had been renewed, they would have suffered a great loss of men, because Cnut had more ships. King Cnut did not pursue them.

This left Cnut as the dominant leader in Scandinavia. At some time after the battle, Cnut subjugated the core provinces of Sweden around Lake Mälaren where he had his own coins minted in Sigtuna.

Primary sources
The battle is retold in skaldic poetry and in sources such as the Danish Gesta Danorum by Saxo Grammaticus and the Icelandic Saga of Olaf the Holy by Snorri Sturluson. Opinions are divided as to whether the location was at Helgeå in Uppland, Sweden or the Helge River of eastern Scania, Denmark.

In the Anglo-Saxon Chronicle, the battle is dated to 1025 and the Swedes won the battle.
A.D. 1025. This year King Cnut went to Denmark with a fleet to the holm by the holy river; where against him there came Ulf and Eglaf, with a very large force both by land and sea, from Sweden. There were very many men lost on the side of King Cnut, both of Danish and English; and the Swedes had possession of the field of battle.

References

Other sources
Rosborn, Sven  Den skånska historien (Vikingarna. Malmö: 2004)
The Battle of Helgå, as told in the Saga of Olaf Haraldsson, by Snorri Sturluson.

Cnut the Great
Battles involving the Vikings
Naval battles involving the Vikings
Naval battles involving Sweden
Naval battles involving Norway
Naval battles involving Denmark
Conflicts in 1026
Naval battles involving England
1026 in Europe
11th century in Sweden